Grace Under Pressure Tour may refer to:

 Grace Under Pressure Tour (album), a 2006 album by Rush
 Grace Under Pressure Tour (video), a concert video by Rush

See also
 Grace Under Pressure (Rush album)